Teo Krüüner (born on 8 July 1943 in Antsla) is an Estonian Major General and former Commander of the Estonian Air Force.

From 1996 until 2004, he was the Commander of the Estonian Air Force.

In 2000, he was awarded with Order of the Cross of the Eagle, III class.

References

Living people
1943 births
Estonian military personnel
Recipients of the Military Order of the Cross of the Eagle, Class III
People from Antsla